General George Ainslie was a Scottish general in the British Army, the Colonel of the 13th (1st Somersetshire) Regiment of Foot (appointed on the 5 June 1789), and lieutenant-governor of the Scilly Islands, who died on 7 July 1804.

He was a son of George Ainslie, Esq., the representative of the ancient Scottish family of Ainslie of Dolphinton in Lanarkshire, chief of the name, and Jane Ainslie, the daughter of Sir Philip Anstruther of Anstrutherfield. George and Jane Ainslie had seven children in total, including four daughters, three of whom were married and established in France.

The brothers of the younger George Ainslie were Sir Philip Ainslie, who was born in 1728 and died on 19 June 1802, and Sir Robert Ainslie, 1st Baronet, who was an ambassador to the Ottoman Empire (Ottoman Porte), orientalist and numismatist, and a Member of Parliament (MP) for the rotten borough of Milborne Port in Somerset between 1796 and 1802.

George Ainslie's grandson was Thomas Corbett (Lincolnshire MP).

References

British Army generals
1804 deaths
People from South Lanarkshire
Somerset Light Infantry officers